Asle Toje (born February 16, 1974) is the Deputy Leader of the Norwegian Nobel Committee (2018-2023). He is a foreign policy scholar and was Research Director at the Norwegian Nobel Institute from 2009 until he joined the Nobel Peace Prize Committee. Toje is a regular contributor to the Norwegian foreign policy debate, including as a regular columnist in the Dagens Næringsliv, Minerva. In the Norwegian foreign policy discourse he has been a proponent of democracy, market economy, the rule of law, and conservatism. Toje has in recent years spent most of his time on issues at the intersection of nuclear disarmament, peace and geopolitics.

Academic career 
Asle Toje was educated at universities in Oslo and Tromsø before going on to study international relations (Dr. Phil.) at  Pembroke College, Cambridge, where he graduated in 2006. According to his own statement, Toje belongs to the neoclassical realism school in. As an academic, Toje is best known for having further developed the "transatlantic bargain" thesis, in which he argues that the US presence through NATO and European integration in the form of the EU constitutes a so-called "integrated complex". In 2010, he published the book The European Union as a Small Power: After the Post-Cold War.

Bibliography 
Gullbrikkespillet: Et Europa i ruiner (Oslo, Dreyer, 2020)
The Causes of Peace: What We Know Now (Ed. w. Bård Nicholas Vik Steen, Houston, Nobel Press, 2019)
Will China's Rise Be Peaceful?: Security, Stability, and Legitimacy  (Ed., Oxford University Press, Ed. 2018)
Jernburet – Liberalismens krise (Oslo, Dreyer Forlag, 2014)
Rødt, Hvitt & Blått – Om demokratiet i Europa (Oslo, Dreyer Forlag, 2012)
Neoclassical Realism in European Politics Ed. w, B.Kunz (Manchester, Manchester University Press, 2012)
The European Union as a small power - after the post Cold War (London, Palgrave / Macmillan, 2010)
America, the EU and Strategic Culture: Renegotiating the Transatlantic Bargain (London, Routledge, 2008)

References

External links 
 Tojes Blog

 Search WorldCat
 (http://e24.no/kommentar/e24-kommentar/article3712979.ece)
 http://onlinelibrary.wiley.com/doi/10.1111/j.1478-9302.2012.00283_10.x/abstract

1974 births
Living people
Norwegian political writers
Foreign policy writers
Norwegian columnists
Political realists
Alumni of Pembroke College, Cambridge
People from Akershus
Neoclassical realists(international relations)